Kurds in Norway are Kurds living in Norway. The number of Kurds is estimated between 7,100 and 25,000 and they come mainly from countries in the Middle East. Most Norwegian Kurds live in the capital Oslo. In 1993, population of Kurds in Norway was estimated as 2,000 by Kurdish Institute of Paris (KIP). Today, citing a report of the KIP, Rudaw estimates that between 25,000 and 30,000 Kurds reside in Norway.

Political representation 
In the 2021 Norwegian parliamentary election, two Kurdish-Norwegians were elected being Seher Aydar of the Red Party and the other Mani Hussaini from the Labour Party.

See also 

 Kurdish diaspora

References 

Asian diaspora in Norway
Kurdish diaspora in Europe